= Vladamir Fortunato =

- Born: 1885
- Died: 1938 (aged 52–53)

Vladamir M. Fortunato (1885 – 1938) was a Russian-American physician and sculptor.
